Carex hymenolepis is a tussock-forming species of perennial sedge in the family Cyperaceae. It is native to parts of the Himalayas.

See also
List of Carex species

References

hymenolepis
Plants described in 1834
Taxa named by Christian Gottfried Daniel Nees von Esenbeck
Flora of Pakistan
Flora of Nepal